The 2013 New Jersey State Senate election coincided with Chris Christie's landslide re-election to a second term as Governor of New Jersey.

2013 was an election of remarkable stability in the Senate, as just one seat (that of gubernatorial nominee Buono) failed to return its incumbent to office. As a corollary, no seats changed party for the second consecutive election.

Summary of results

Close races 
Seats where the margin of victory was under 10%:

Incumbents not running for re-election

Democratic 
 Barbara Buono (District 18) (ran for Governor)

Summary of results by State Senate district

District 1

District 2

District 3

District 4

District 5

District 6

District 7

District 8

District 9

District 10

District 11

District 12

District 13

District 14

District 15

District 16

District 17

District 18

District 19

District 20

District 21

District 22

District 23

District 24

District 25

District 26

District 27

District 28

District 29

District 30

District 31

District 32

District 33

District 34

District 35

District 36

District 37

District 38

District 39

District 40

References

2013
State senate
New Jersey State Senate